Rosetown was a federal electoral district in Saskatchewan, Canada, that was represented in the House of Commons of Canada from 1925 to 1935.

This riding was created in 1924 from parts of Battleford, Kindersley and North Battleford ridings.

It was abolished in 1933 when it was redistributed into The Battlefords and Rosetown—Biggar ridings.

Election results

See also 

 List of Canadian federal electoral districts
 Past Canadian electoral districts

References

External links 

Former federal electoral districts of Saskatchewan
Rosetown